The 40th Infantry Division (40-ya Pekhotnaya Diviziya) was an infantry formation of the Russian Imperial Army.

During the First World War on 13 July 1915 the 40th Infantry Division, alongside the 50th Infantry Division successfully defended the Pultusk bridgehead from German forces attempting to cross the river Narew at Pułtusk.

Organization
1st Brigade
157th Imeretinsky Infantry Regiment (formed 11/6/1863)
158th Kutaisi Infantry Regiment (formed 11/6/1863)
The 1st Brigade participated in the Battle of Kars. From 1892 the 1st Brigade was based at the Babruysk fortress, Belarus.

2nd Brigade
159th Infantry Regiment
160th Infantry Regiment
40th Artillery Brigade

References

Infantry divisions of the Russian Empire
Military units and formations disestablished in 1918